Mystic Pop-up Bar is a 2020 South Korean television series starring Hwang Jung-eum, Yook Sung-jae and Choi Won-young. Based on the Daum webtoon Twin Tops Bar by Bae Hye-soo, it is the first series to air on JTBC's Wednesday–Thursday time slot in eight years. The series aired from May 20 to June 25, 2020.

Synopsis
Mystic Pop-up Bar tells the story of a mysterious pojangmacha (outdoor drinking establishment) run by an ill-tempered woman named Weol-ju (Hwang Jung-eum), an innocent part-time employee named Han Kang-bae (Yook Sung-jae), and a former afterlife detective known as Chief Gwi (Choi Won-young) who visit customers in their dreams to help resolve their problems. Kang-bae has a unique ability that is useful to Weol-ju - with a touch, he can make people pour out all their troubles. This is very useful to Weol-ju who needs to settle the grudges of 100,000 souls.

Cast

Main
 Hwang Jung-eum as Weol-ju
Park Si-eun as young Weol-ju
 A hot-tempered woman who is the owner of Mystic Pop-up Bar. 500 years ago, Weol-ju healed the Crown Prince through his dreams but was falsely accused of seducing him, and was targeted by an assassin who killed Weol-ju's mother instead. Weol-ju's sin was committing suicide on the Sacred Tree, causing it to lose its power on a conflict that took 100,000 lives. For the past 500 years, she was sent to the Living Realm to settle the grudges of 100,000 souls and comfort them as a punishment to atone for her past sin.
 Yook Sung-jae as Han Kang-bae
 A cheerful young man who has the ability to make people confess the truth by making physical contact with them. Hence, he creeps the people around him and grew up being an outcast. He worked with Weol-ju as she promised him to get rid of this unique ability in exchange.  He is eventually revealed to be the spirit of Weol-ju and Yi-Hon's unborn child which was cursed with the Sorrow of the Sacred Tree.
 Choi Won-young as Chief Gwi (aka Guibanjang) / Crown Prince Yi-Hon
 Song Geon-hee as young Crown Prince Yi-hon
 Formerly the Crown Prince who fell in love with Weol-ju but was unable to protect her, so he slew the instigator of her death, his former best friend, Kim Won-hyung. Once worked for the Afterlife Police Agency, he was given a chance to work as the manager at Mystic Pop-up Bar to be at Weol-ju's side.

Supporting

Realm of the Dead
 Yeom Hye-ran as God of the Underworld, Yeomradaewang
As the God of the Underworld, she is the one who executed the 500-years-long punishment on Weol-ju.
 Lee Jun-hyeok as Department Chief Yeom / Lord Kim Jin
In his past life, he was a minister at the palace, mentor of the Crown Prince and father of Won-hyung. His loyalty and dedication for the prince had driven him away from his son. In the present, he became an angel of death who is Chief Gwi's best friend and frequently visit Weol-ju's pop-up bar.
 Na In-woo as Kim Won-hyung
 He is Lord Kim Jin's son and Crown Prince Yi-hon's best friend, however his coup d'état was uncovered and he was beheaded by the Crown Prince on his sister's and prince's wedding day. In present day, he escaped from his punishment as an evil spirit to get revenge upon Crown Prince Yi-hon and Weol-ju.
 Oh Young-sil as Samsin
The goddess of childbirth and fate. She is a close friend of Weol-ju.
 Yoo Jae-myung as Jade Emperor (voice only)

Kapeul Mart
 Jung Da-eun as Kang Yeo-rin
 The only human who is immune to Kang-bae's ability. She was Chairman Choi's personal bodyguard but after her encounter with Weol-ju and Kang-bae, she was fired from her job and eventually became security guard of Kapeul Mart. Although Kang-bae and Yeo-rin love each other, her trauma with her past boyfriends causes her to deny her feelings. She is later revealed to be the reincarnation the spirit of the Cinnabar in a nearby cave, a mineral that protects against evil.
 Ahn Tae-hwan as Choi Jin-dong
 Baek Soo-hee as Kim Da-bin
 Park Ha-na as Song Mi-ran
 Park Joo-hyung as Assistant Manager Park

Special appearances

 Park Eun-hye as Crown Prince's mother / Shin Ji-hye (Ep. 1, 9–10)
 Kim Hee-jung as Wol-joo's mother (Ep. 1)
 Yang Dae-hyuk as Bad customer at Gapeul Mart (Ep. 1)
 Hwang Bo-ra as Chun-hyang (Ep. 1)
 Lee Sang-hwa as Heung-bu (Ep. 1)
 Kwak Sun-young as Eun-soo / Sun-hwa (Ep. 2)
 Baek Ji-won as Ms. Andong (Ep. 2)
 Youn-a as lady-in-waiting (Ep. 3)
 Yoo Sung-joo as Chairman Choi / Local governor (Ep. 3)
 Oh Kyung-joo as Park Byung-jae (Ep. 3)
 Oh Ha-nee as Yu-mi (Ep. 3)
 Woo Hyun as Kim Du-young (Ep. 4)
 Jung Eun-pyo as Choi Seok-pan (Ep. 4)
 Lee Joo-shil as Lee Kkeut-sun (Ep.4)
 Jung Jung-ah as upset customer (Ep. 5)
 Oh Man-seok (stage actor) as Oh Sang-gun (Ep. 5)
 Lee Ji-hyun as Jin-seok (Ep. 5)
 Kim Mi-hwa as health drink vendor (Ep. 5)
 Kwon Hyeok-soo as a company executive (Ep. 5)
 Lee Seo-an as Chae Su-gyung (Ep. 6)
 Tae In-ho as Kang In-ho (Ep. 6)
 Yoon Park as The Gout Lovers actor (Ep. 6)
 Ha Shi-eun as The Gout Lovers actress (Ep.6)
 Choi Dae-hoon as Jang Bok-su (Ep. 7)
 Hwang Hyo-eun as Mrs. Kim (Ep. 7)
 Park Young-soo as Mr. Jang (Ep. 7)
 Kim Yong-gun as Kapeul Mart Chairman (Ep. 7)
 Han So-eun as Shin Bo-ra / Ice Witch (Ep. 8)
 Shin Hyun-soo as Kim Do-young (Ep. 8)
 Moon Jeong-hee as Hyun-ok (Ep. 9)
 So Chan-whee as herself (Ep. 11)
 Ahn Chang-hwan as Mr. Han (Ep. 12)
 Lee Soo-ji as Mr. Han's co-worker (Ep. 12)

Production
The first script reading took place in August 2019 at JTBC Building in Sangam-dong, Seoul, South Korea.

Filming began in September 2019 and ended on February 28, 2020.

Original soundtrack

Part 1

Part 2

Part 3

Part 4

Part 5

Ratings

Notes

References

External links
  
 
 

JTBC television dramas
2020 South Korean television series debuts
2020 South Korean television series endings
South Korean fantasy television series
South Korean mystery television series
Television shows based on South Korean webtoons
South Korean pre-produced television series
Television series by Samhwa Networks
Korean-language Netflix exclusive international distribution programming
Television series by Drama House